Teodor Herța (February 2, 1891 in Alcedar, Moldova) was a Bessarabian politician, deputy in Sfatul Țării, council that exercised the legislative power in the Moldavian Democratic Republic, between 1917–1918.:p. 71

Biography 

He served as Member of the Sfatul Țării (1917–1918).

Gallery

Bibliography 
Gheorghe E. Cojocaru, Sfatul Țării: itinerar, Civitas, Chișinău, 1998, 
Mihai Tașcă, Sfatul Țării și actualele autorități locale, "Timpul de dimineață", no. 114 (849), June 27, 2008 (page 16)

External links 
 Arhiva pentru Sfatul Țării
 Deputații Sfatului Țării și Lavrenti Beria

Notes

1891 births
20th-century deaths
Moldovan MPs 1917–1918
People from Șoldănești District